Gazani or Gozani may refer to:
 Gazani-ye Pain
 Gazani-ye Taj Mohammad